In fortification, the term entrenchment can refer to either a secondary line of defence within a larger fortification (better known as a retrenchment), or an enceinte designed to provide cover for infantry, having a layout similar to a city wall but on a smaller scale. The latter usually consisted of curtain walls and bastions or redans, and was sometimes also protected by a ditch.

In the 18th century, the Knights Hospitaller built a number of coastal and inland entrenchments as part of the fortifications of Malta. Further entrenchments were built in Malta by insurgents during the blockade of 1798–1800, in order to prevent the French from launching a counterattack.

List

References

Fortification (obstacles)
Fortification (architectural elements)